Zoltán Pintér (born 23 November 1977, in Budapest) is a Hungarian football player who currently plays for Szigetszentmiklósi TK.

References
 

1977 births
Living people
Hungarian footballers
Budapest Honvéd FC players
Vasas SC players
Association football midfielders
Hungary international footballers
Footballers from Budapest